"Always" is a song by British synth-pop duo Erasure. The ballad was released on 11 April 1994 as the first single from their sixth studio album, I Say I Say I Say (1994). Written by Erasure members Vince Clarke and Andy Bell, it was produced by Martyn Ware. Mute Records issued the single in the United Kingdom, and Elektra Records released it in the United States.

The song became Erasure's thirteenth top-ten single on the UK Singles Chart, peaking at number four. In the United States, the single became Erasure's third top-20 hit on the Billboard Hot 100, peaking at number 20—six years after their last major US pop hit. On the Billboard Hot Dance Music/Club Play chart, the single climbed to number six. In Europe, "Always" reached number two in Austria and Sweden, number three in Finland, number four in Iceland, and number five in Germany. Its music video was directed by Jan Kounen.

Composition
The song is built on synthesized instruments and with Clarke and Bell's subdued vocals and lyrics. The song's chorus features an unusual time signature change from 4/4 to 5/4 for the final line (in which the lyrics are "Harmony, harmony, oh love").

Chart performance
"Always" was very successful on the charts on several continents, becoming one of the band's biggest hits. In Europe, it peaked at number one in Lithuania and entered the top 10 in Austria (2), Denmark (5), Finland (3), Germany (5), Iceland (4), Ireland (7), Scotland (5), Spain (8), Sweden (2) and the United Kingdom, as well as on the Eurochart Hot 100, where the single hit number four in May 1994. In the UK, it also peaked at number four in its first week at the UK Singles Chart, on 17 April 1994. It became Erasure's 13th top-10 single on the chart and spent two weeks at that position. Additionally, "Always" was a top-20 hit in Belgium (19) and a top-30 hit in both Italy (23) and Switzerland (23). Outside Europe, the song reached number one in Israel, number six on the Billboard Dance Club Songs chart and number 20 on the Billboard Hot 100 in the United States, number 19 on the RPM Top Singles chart in Canada and number 78 in Australia. 

"Always" earned a gold record in Germany, after 250,000 singles were sold, and a silver record in the United Kingdom, with a sale of 200,000 units.

Critical reception
Larry Flick from Billboard stated that the song "glides along at a slick, compu-hip pace. Andy Bell has rarely sounded as good as he does here, contrasting the icy-smooth synth nature of Martyn Ware's production with a warm, well-shaded vocal. The tune is embellished with faster trance beats that fit current trends extremely well, without sacrificing the catchy hook." Troy J. Augusto from Cash Box felt that "flamboyant frontman Bell’s voice is as smooth and bittersweet as ever, a nifty companion to Clarke's upbeat programming and producer Martyn Ware’s almost industrial style." David Browne from Entertainment Weekly called it a "lament" and a "moving declaration of undying love." He noted Bell's "pained, naked wisp of a voice dips upward in the chorus ("I want to be with you")." Dave Sholin from the Gavin Report said the song is "execeptional, mid-tempo Euro-pop". Caroline Sullivan from The Guardian viewed it as "timeless". In his weekly UK chart commentary, James Masterton wrote, "One of the best singles they have released for years, the anthemic pop song is sure to hang around the upper reaches for a few weeks yet." 

Mario Tarradell for The Miami Herald deemed it as "bouncy fun" and "ideal summer fare – light, bubbly and innocuous." Pan-European magazine Music & Media commented, "Nobody can continue the early '80s like them. Flashbacks of the prototypes of synthesisers come to mind when receiving these Martian sounds bleeping through a prosaic pop song." Alan Jones from Music Week gave it five out of five, describing it as "busy, perky pop with the deftest of touches, this is another hugely commercial and nicely understated piece enlivened by Vince Clarke's tickering synths and Andy Bell's warm contralto." John Kilgo from The Network Forty deemed it "an interesting techno pop number". A reviewer from People Magazine felt that Bell's "quasi-operatic vocals continue to lend color and depth to Clarke's effete synthetic grooves". Mark Frith from Smash Hits gave it three out of five, calling it "a nice catchy tune with strange squiggly bits and electronic noises. The annoying thing is that this could have been one of their great records if they had upped the pace and really gone for it." Dardy Chang from Stanford Daily described it as "cheesy yet pretty", noting that the song "begs you to sing along".

Retrospective response
AllMusic editor Ned Raggett described "Always" as a "wonderful ballad" with a "slightly quirky opening, strong verses both musically and lyrically, and a flat-out brilliant chorus, Bell's impassioned delivery one of his finest moments." John Hamilton from Idolator ranked the song among "The 50 Best Pop Singles of 1994" in 2014, describing it as a "bleep-bloopy disco ballad featuring some of Andy Bell’s most delicate vocals to-date." Same year, Chris Gerard from Metro Weekly stated, "They made a triumphant return with "Always", a divine synth-pop ballad that proved irresistible to pop radio." In 2009, Darren Lee from The Quietus called it a "surefooted day-glo" pop anthem, "which fitted seamlessly into the canon".

Music video
The accompanying music video for "Always" features Andy Bell in a Chinese scroll painting-inspired backdrop; it was directed by the Dutch-French filmmaker Jan Kounen. The singer appears as a mystical figure flying into a wintery garden, where he finds a woman standing in the cold by a pavilion. She is covered with snow and her eyes are closed. He uses his magical abilities, throws a magic ball in the air. Suddenly flowers are blooming and it becomes summer in the garden. The woman wakes up. Bell picks flowers for her and combs her hair. Suddenly, a dark dragon-like creature appears and it gets dark and wintery in the garden. Bell must defend the woman against the creature, who now has the magic ball and makes a huge snowball that the two are being caught in. Frozen in the snow, Bell manages to use the magic ball, so that it becomes summer again. The creature is fought and falls to the ground. The video ends with Bell flying away from the woman in the summery garden. 

"Always" received heavy rotation on MTV Europe and was A-listed on Germany's VIVA.

Track listings

 UK 7-inch and cassette single (MUTE152; CMUTE152)
 "Always"
 "Tragic"

 UK 12-inch single (12MUTE152)
 "Always"
 "Tragic"
 "Always" (Cappella club mix)
 "Always" (Microbots Trance Dance Mix)

 UK CD1 (CDMUTE152)
 "Always"
 "Always" (extended mix)
 "Tragic"

 UK CD2 (LCDMUTE152)
 "Always" (Cappella club mix)
 "Always" (Microbots Trance Dance Mix)
 "Always" (Microbots In Your Brain Mix)
 "Always" (Hey Mix)

 US maxi-single (66225-2)
 "Always" (7-inch mix)
 "Always" (Cappella club mix)
 "Always" (Hey Mix)
 "Tragic"

Charts

Weekly charts

Year-end charts

Certifications

Covers
The song has been covered live as an intro piece by synthpop musician MNDR. In 2012 the synthpop band Xiu Xiu covered the song for a Record Store Day single.

In popular culture
The 2009 mix of the song (found on Pop! Remixed and on Total Pop! The First 40 Hits) is featured in the Robot Unicorn Attack video game.

References

1994 singles
1994 songs
1990s ballads
Electropop ballads
Elektra Records singles
Erasure songs
Irish Singles Chart number-one singles
Mute Records singles
Songs written by Andy Bell (singer)
Songs written by Vince Clarke